The Amundsen–Scott South Pole Station is the United States scientific research station at the South Pole of the Earth. It is the southernmost point under the jurisdiction (not sovereignty) of the United States. It is administered by the Office of Polar Programs of the National Science Foundation, specifically the United States Antarctic Program (USAP). It is named in honor of Norwegian Roald Amundsen and Briton Robert F. Scott, who led separate teams that raced to become the first to the pole in the early 1900s.

The original Amundsen–Scott Station was built by Navy Seabees for the federal government of the United States during November 1956, as part of its commitment to the scientific goals of the International Geophysical Year, an effort lasting from January 1957 through June 1958 to study, among other things, the geophysics of the polar regions of Earth.

Before November 1956, there was no permanent artificial structure at the pole, and practically no human presence in the interior of Antarctica. The few scientific stations in Antarctica were near its coast. The station has been continuously occupied since it was built and has been rebuilt, expanded, and upgraded several times.

The station is the only inhabited place on the surface of the Earth from which the Sun is continuously visible for six months; it is then continuously dark for the next six months, with approximately two days of averaged dark and light, twilight, namely the equinoxes. These are, in observational terms, called one extremely long "day" and one equally long "night". During the six-month "day", the angle of elevation of the Sun above the horizon varies incrementally. The Sun reaches a rising position throughout the September equinox, and then it is apparent highest at the December solstice which is summer solstice for the south, setting on the March equinox.

During the six-month polar night, air temperatures can drop below  and blizzards are more frequent. Between these storms, and regardless of the weather for wavelengths unaffected by drifting snow, the roughly  months of ample darkness and dry atmosphere make the station an excellent site for astronomical observations.

The number of scientific researchers and members of the support staff housed at the Amundsen–Scott Station has always varied seasonally, with a peak population of around 150 in the summer operational season from October to February. In recent years the wintertime population has been around 50 people.

Structures

Original station (1957–2010)

The original South Pole station is now referred to as "Old Pole".

The station was constructed by U.S. Navy Seabees led by LTJG Richard Bowers, the eight-man Advance Party being transported by the VX-6 Air Squadron in two R4Ds on November 20, 1956. The U.S. Eighteenth Air Force's C-124 Globemaster IIs airdropped most of the equipment and building material. The buildings were constructed from prefabricated four-by-eight-foot modular panels. Skylights were the only windows in flat uniform roof levels, while buildings were connected by a burlap and chicken wire covered tunnel system. The last of the construction crew departed on January 4, 1957. The first wintering-over party consisted of eight IGY scientists led by Paul Siple and eight Navy support men led by LTJG John Tuck. Key components of the camp included an astronomical observatory, a Rawin Tower, a weather balloon inflation shelter, and a 1000-foot snow tunnel with pits for a seismometer and magnetometer.

On January 3, 1958, Sir Edmund Hillary's team from New Zealand, part of the Commonwealth Trans-Antarctic Expedition, reached the station over land from Scott Base, followed shortly by Sir Vivian Fuchs' British scientific component.

The buildings of Old Pole were assembled from prefabricated components delivered to the South Pole by air and airdropped. They were originally built on the surface, with covered wood-framed walkways connecting the buildings.

The station was abandoned in 1975 and became deeply buried, with the pressure causing the mostly wooden roof to cave in. The station was demolished in December 2010, after an equipment operator fell through the structure doing snow stability testing for the National Science Foundation (NSF). The area was being vetted for use as a campground for NGO guests.

Dome (1975–2010)
One served as the entry to the dome and it had a transverse arch that contained modular buildings for the station's maintenance, fuel bladders, power plant, snow melter, equipment and vehicles. Individual buildings within the dome contained the dorms, galley, recreational center, post office and labs for monitoring the upper and lower atmosphere and numerous other complex projects in astronomy and astrophysics. The station also included the Skylab, a box-shaped tower slightly taller than the dome. Skylab was connected to the Dome by a tunnel. The Skylab housed atmospheric sensor equipment and later a music room.

During the 1970–1974 summers, the Seabees constructing the dome were housed in Korean War era Jamesway huts. A hut consists of a wooden frame with a raised platform covered by canvas tarp. A double-doored vestibule was at each end. Although heated, the heat was not sufficient to keep them habitable during the winter. After several burned during the 1976–1977 summer, the construction camp was abandoned and later removed.

However, in the 1981–1982 season, extra civilian seasonal personnel were housed in a group of Jamesways known as the "summer camp". Initially consisting of only two huts, the camp grew to 11 huts housing about 10 people each, plus two recreational huts with bathroom and gym facilities. In addition, a number of science and berthing structures, such as the hypertats and elevated dormitory, were added in the 1990s, particularly for astronomy and astrophysics.

During the period in which the dome served as the main station, many changes to United States South Pole operation took place. From the 1990s on, astrophysical research conducted at the South Pole took advantage of its favorable atmospheric conditions and began to produce important scientific results. Such experiments include the Python, Viper, and DASI telescopes, as well as the  South Pole Telescope. The DASI telescope has since been decommissioned and its mount used for the Keck Array. The AMANDA / IceCube experiment makes use of the two-mile (3 km)-thick ice sheet to detect neutrinos which have passed through the earth. An observatory building, the Martin A. Pomerantz Observatory (MAPO), was dedicated in 1995. The importance of these projects changed the priorities in station operation, increasing the status of scientific cargo and personnel.

The 1998–1999 summer season was the last year that VXE-6 with its Lockheed LC-130s serviced the U.S. Antarctic Program. Beginning in 1999–2000, the New York Air National Guard 109th Airlift Wing took responsibility for the daily cargo and passenger flights between McMurdo Station and the South Pole during the summer.

During the winter of 1988 a loud crack was heard in the dome. Upon investigation it was discovered that the foundation base ring beams were broken due to being overstressed.

The dome was dismantled in late 2009. It was crated and given to the Seabees. They have it in storage at Port Hueneme, California. The center oculus is suspended in a display at the Seabee Museum there.

Elevated station (2008–present)
In 1992, the design of a new station began for an  building with two floor levels that cost US$150 million. Construction began in 1999, adjacent to the Dome. The facility was officially dedicated on January 12, 2008, with a ceremony that included the de-commissioning of the old Dome station. The ceremony was attended by a number of dignitaries flown in specifically for the day, including National Science Foundation Director Arden Bement, scientist Susan Solomon and other government officials.  The entirety of building materials to complete the build of the new South Pole Station were flown in from McMurdo Station by the LC-130 Hercules aircraft and the 139th Airlift Squadron Stratton Air National Guard Base, Scotia, New York. Each plane brought  of cargo each flight with the total weight of the building material being .

The new station included a modular design, to accommodate rises in population, and an adjustable elevation to prevent it from being buried in snow. The building faces into the wind with a sloping lower portion of wall. The angled wall increases the wind speed as it flows under the buildings, and passes above the snow-pack, causing the snow to be scoured away. This prevents the building from being quickly buried. Wind tunnel tests show that scouring will continue to occur until the snow level reaches the second floor.

Because snow gradually settles over time under its own weight, the foundations of the building were designed to accommodate substantial differential settling over any one wing in any one line or any one column. If differential settling continues, the supported structure will need to be jacked up and re-leveled. The facility was designed with the primary support columns outboard of the exterior walls so that the entire building can be jacked up a full floor level. During this process, a new section of column will be added over the existing columns then the jacks pull the building up to the higher elevation.

Operation
During the summer the station population is typically around 150. Most personnel leave by the middle of February, leaving a few dozen (39 in 2021) "winter-overs", mostly support staff plus a few scientists, who keep the station functional through the months of Antarctic night. The winter personnel are isolated between mid-February and late October. Wintering-over presents notorious dangers and stresses, as the station population is almost totally isolated. The station is completely self-sufficient during the winter, and powered by three generators running on JP-8 jet fuel. An annual tradition is a back-to-back-to-back viewing of The Thing from Another World (1951), The Thing (1982), and The Thing (2011) after the last flight has left for the winter.

Research at the station includes glaciology, geophysics, meteorology, upper atmosphere physics, astronomy, astrophysics, and biomedical studies. In recent years, most of the winter scientists have worked for the IceCube Neutrino Observatory or for low-frequency astronomy experiments such as the South Pole Telescope and BICEP2.

There is a small greenhouse at the station. The variety of vegetables and herbs in the greenhouse, which range from fresh eggplant to jalapeños, are all produced hydroponically, using only water and nutrients and no soil. The greenhouse is the only source of fresh fruit and vegetables during the winter.

Transportation

Between October and February, there are several flights per day of U.S. Air Force ski-equipped Lockheed LC-130 Hercules aircraft from the New York Air National Guard, 109 AW, 139AS Stratton Air National Guard via McMurdo Station to supply the station. Resupply missions are collectively termed Operation Deep Freeze.

There is a snow road over the ice sheet from McMurdo, the McMurdo-South Pole highway, which is 995 miles (1601 km) long.

Communication

Data access to the station is provided by NASA's TDRS-4, 5, and 6 satellites, the DOD DSCS-3 satellite, and the commercial Iridium satellite constellation. For the 2007–2008 season, the TDRS relay (named South Pole TDRSS Relay or SPTR) was upgraded to support a data return rate of 50 Mbit/s, which comprises over 90% of the data return capability. The TDRS-1 satellite formerly provided services to the station, but it failed in October 2009 and was subsequently decommissioned. Marisat and LES9 were also formerly used. In July 2016, the GOES-3 satellite was decommissioned due to it nearing the end of its supply of propellant and was replaced by the use of the DSCS-3 satellite, a military communications satellite. DSCS-3 can provide a 30 MB/s data rate compared to GOES-3's 1.5 MB/s. DSCS-3 and TDRS-4, 5, and 6 are used together to provide the main communications capability for the station. These satellites provide the data uplink for the station's scientific data as well as provide broadband internet and telecommunications access. Only during the main satellite events is the station's telephone system able to dial out. The commercial Iridium satellite is used when the TDRS and DSCS satellites are all out of range to give the station limited communications capability during those times. During those times, telephone calls may only be made on several Iridium satellite telephone sets owned by the station. The station's IT system also has a limited data uplink over the Iridium network, which allows emails less than 100 KB to be sent and received at all times and small critical data files to be transmitted. This uplink works by bonding the data stream over 12 voice channels.
Non-commercial and non-military communication has been provided by amateur ham radio using primarily HF SSB links today but Morse code and other modes have been used, partly in experiments and mainly in bolstering esprit de corp and hobby-type uses.  The USA sector has the amateur radio call sign prefix run of KC4 and AT; whereas soviet/Russian stations are known to use 4K1 and others.  The popularity of the hobby during the 1950-80s era saw many ham exchanges between South Polar ham stations and enthusiastic ham operators contacting there from world-wide locations. Over the years, ham radio has established needed emergency communication to Polar base personnel as well as recreational uses.

Astrophysics experiments at the station

Cosmic Microwave Background Telescopes:
 Python Telescope (1992–1997), used to observe temperature anisotropies in the cosmic microwave background (CMB).
 Viper telescope (1997–2000), used to observe temperature anisotropies in the CMB. Was refitted with the ACBAR bolometer (2000-2008).
 DASI (1999–2000), used to measure the temperature and power spectrum of the CMB.
 The QUaD (2004–2009), used the DASI mount, used to make detailed observations of CMB polarization.
 The BICEP1 (2006–2008) and BICEP2 (2010–2012) instruments were also used to observe polarization anisotropies in the CMB. BICEP3 was installed in 2015.
 South Pole Telescope (2007–present), used to survey the CMB to look for distant galaxy clusters.
 The Keck Array (2010–present), using the DASI mount, is now used to continue work on the polarization anisotropies of the CMB.

Neutrino Experiments
 AMANDA (1997–2009) was an experiment to detect neutrinos.
 IceCube (2010–present) is an experiment to detect neutrinos.
 Radio Ice Cherenkov Experiment or RICE (1999–2012), an experiment to detect ultra high energy (UHE) neutrinos.
 Neutrino Array Radio Calibration or NARC (2008–2012), an upgrade of the RICE experiment.
 Askaryan Radio Array or ARA (2011–present), a successor of RICE, currently (as of 2022) under construction.

Climate

Typical of inland Antarctica, Amundsen–Scott South Pole Station experiences an ice cap climate (EF) with BWk precipitation patterns. The peak season of summer lasts from December to mid February.

Media and events
In 1991, Michael Palin visited the base on the eighth and final episode of his BBC Television documentary, Pole to Pole.

On January 10, 1995, NASA, PBS, and NSF collaborated for the first live television broadcast from the South Pole, titled Spaceship South Pole. During this interactive broadcast, students from several schools in the United States asked the scientists at the station questions about their work and conditions at the pole.

In 1999, CBS News correspondent Jerry Bowen reported on camera in a talkback with anchors from the Saturday edition of CBS This Morning.

In 1999, the winter-over physician, Jerri Nielsen, found that she had breast cancer. She had to rely on self-administered chemotherapy, using supplies from a daring July cargo drop, then was picked up in an equally dangerous mid-October landing.

On May 11, 2000, astrophysicist Rodney Marks became ill while walking between the remote observatory and the base. He became increasingly sick over 36 hours, three times returning increasingly distressed to the station's doctor. Advice was sought by satellite, but Marks died on May 12, 2000, with his condition undiagnosed. The National Science Foundation issued a statement that Rodney Marks had "apparently died of natural causes, but the specific cause of death had yet to be determined". The exact cause of Marks' death could not be determined until his body was removed from Amundsen–Scott Station and flown off Antarctica for an autopsy. Marks' death was due to methanol poisoning, and the case received media attention as the "first South Pole murder", although there is no evidence that Marks died as the result of the act of another person.

On 26 April 2001, Kenn Borek Air used a DHC-6 Twin Otter aircraft to rescue Dr. Ronald Shemenski from Amundsen–Scott. This was the first ever rescue from the South Pole during polar winter. To achieve the range necessary for this flight, the Twin Otter was equipped with a special ferry tank.

In January 2007, the station was visited by a group of high-level Russian officials, including FSB chiefs Nikolai Patrushev and Vladimir Pronichev. The expedition, led by polar explorer Artur Chilingarov, started from Chile on two Mi-8 helicopters and landed at the South Pole.

On September 6, 2007, The National Geographic Channel's television show Man Made aired an episode on the construction of their new facility.

On November 9, 2007, edition of NBC's Today, show co-anchor Ann Curry made a satellite telephone call which was broadcast live from the South Pole.

On Christmas 2007, two employees at the base got into a fight and had to be evacuated.

On July 11, 2011, the winter-over communications technician fell ill and was diagnosed with appendicitis. An emergency open appendectomy was performed by the station doctors with several winter-overs assisting during the surgery.

The 2011 BBC TV programme Frozen Planet discusses the base and shows footage of the inside and outside of the elevated station in the "Last Frontier Episode".

During the 2011 winter-over season, station manager Renee-Nicole Douceur experienced a stroke on August 27, resulting in loss of vision and cognitive function. Because the Amundsen–Scott base lacks diagnostic medical equipment such as an MRI or CT scan machine, station doctors were unable to fully evaluate the damage done by the stroke or the chance of recurrence. Physicians on site recommended a medevac flight as soon as possible for Douceur, but offsite doctors hired by Raytheon Polar Services (the company contracted to run the base) and the National Science Foundation disagreed with the severity of the situation. The National Science Foundation, which is the final authority on all flights and assumes all financial responsibility for the flights, denied the request for medevac, saying the weather was still too hazardous. Plans were made to evacuate Douceur on the first flight available. Douceur and her niece, believing Douceur's condition to be grave and believing an earlier medevac flight possible, contacted Senator Jeanne Shaheen for assistance; as the NSF continued to state Douceur's condition did not qualify for a medevac attempt and conditions at the base would not permit an earlier flight, Douceur and her supporters brought the situation to media attention. Douceur was evacuated, along with a doctor and an escort, on an October 17 cargo flight. This was the first flight available when the weather window opened up on October 16. This first flight is usually solely for supply and refueling of the station, and does not customarily accept passengers, as the plane's cabin is unpressurized. The evacuation was successful, and Douceur arrived in Christchurch, New Zealand, at 10:55 p.m. She ultimately made a full recovery.

In March 2014, BICEP2 announced that they had detected B-modes from gravitational waves generated in the early universe, supporting the inflation theory of cosmology. Later analysis showed that BICEP only saw polarized dust signal in the galaxy and not primordial B-modes.

On 20 June 2016, there was another medical evacuation of two personnel around midwinter day, again involving Kenn Borek Air and DHC-6 Twin Otter aircraft.

In December 2016, Buzz Aldrin was visiting the Amundsen–Scott South Pole Station, Antarctica, as part of a tourist group, when he fell ill and was evacuated, first to McMurdo Station and from there to Christchurch, New Zealand, where he was reported to be in stable condition. Aldrin's visit at age 86 makes him the oldest person to ever reach the South Pole.

In the summer of 2016–17, Anthony Bourdain filmed part of an episode of his television show Anthony Bourdain: Parts Unknown at the station.

In popular culture
Science and life at the Amundsen-Scott South Pole station is documented in Dr. John Bird's award-winning book, One Day, One Night: Portraits of the South Pole which chronicles the South Pole Foucault Pendulum, the 300 Club, the first midwinter medevac, and science at the Pole including climate change and cosmology.

Science fiction author Kim Stanley Robinson's book Antarctica features a fictionalized account of the culture at Amundsen–Scott and McMurdo, set in the near future.

The station is featured prominently in the 1998 The X-Files film Fight the Future.

The 2009 film Whiteout is mainly set at the Amundsen–Scott base, although the building layouts are completely different.

The turn-based strategy game Civilization VI, in its expansion Rise and Fall, included the Amundsen–Scott South Pole Station as a Wonder.

The anime OVA Mobile Suit Gundam: The Origin features a large city in Antarctica called Scott City under a Geodesic dome not unlike the 1975 dome as the location of a major peace conference between the human space colonies controlled by Zeon and the Earth Federation.

The 2019 film Where'd You Go, Bernadette features the station prominently and includes scenes of its construction at the closing credits, although the actual station depicted in the film is Halley VI British Antarctic Research Station.

Time zone
The South Pole sees the Sun rise and set only once a year. Due to atmospheric refraction, these do not occur exactly on the September equinox and the March equinox, respectively: the Sun is above the horizon for four days longer at each equinox. The place has no solar time; there is no daily maximum or minimum solar height above the horizon. The station uses New Zealand time (UTC+12 during standard time and UTC+13 during daylight saving time) since all flights to McMurdo station depart from Christchurch and, therefore, all official travel from the pole goes through New Zealand.

The zone identifier in the IANA time zone database was the deprecated Antarctica/South_Pole. It now uses the Pacific/Auckland timezone.

See also
 Concordia Station
 Kunlun Station
 List of Antarctic field camps
 List of Antarctic research stations
 Paul Siple
 Polheim, Amundsen's name for the first South Pole camp.
 Scott Base
 Vostok Station

References

External links

 
 
 
 
 
 
 
 
 
 

1956 establishments in Antarctica
Outposts of Antarctica
United States Antarctic Program
Antarctic Specially Managed Areas
South Pole